WRKU (102.1 FM, "U102.1") is a radio station  broadcasting a hot adult contemporary format. Licensed to Forestville, Wisconsin, United States, the station serves Door and Kewaunee counties.  The station is currently owned by Bryan Mazur, through licensee Mazur, LLC.

In September 2021, WRKU rebranded as "U102.1".

References

External links

RKU
Hot adult contemporary radio stations in the United States
Radio stations established in 1989